Horloff is a river of Hesse, Germany. It passes through Hungen and Reichelsheim, and flows into the Nidda in Florstadt.

See also
List of rivers of Hesse

References

Rivers of Hesse
Rivers of the Vogelsberg
Rivers of Germany